Callum Ah Chee (born 9 October 1997) is an Australian rules footballer who plays for the Brisbane Lions in the Australian Football League (AFL).

Early life
Ah Chee was born in Derby, Western Australia,  Australia. His mother is Indigenous Australian (Nyoongar) and Dutch. His father is Indigenous Australian (Nyikina & Yawuru) and Chinese. The family moved to the south-east Perth suburb of Armadale when Callum was three years of age. His older brother, Brendon, is also a professional Australian rules footballer, and played for the West Coast Eagles and Port Adelaide Power.

Ah Chee initially played basketball in his youth before picking up Australian rules football and playing for South Fremantle. He began playing colts football in 2013 and made his WAFL senior debut at the age of 17 for South Fremantle. He also represented Western Australia at the 2014 and 2015 AFL Under 18 Championships.

AFL career
Ah Chee was drafted by the Gold Coast Football Club with their first selection and eighth overall in the 2015 national draft. He was traded to Brisbane at the end of the 2019 AFL season.

Statistics
Updated to the end of the 2022 season.

|- 
| 2016 ||  || 13
| 16 || 9 || 9 || 85 || 124 || 209 || 46 || 49 || 0.6 || 0.6 || 5.3 || 7.8 || 13.1 || 2.9 || 3.1
|-
| 2017 ||  || 13
| 14 || 12 || 3 || 85 || 74 || 159 || 34 || 43 || 0.9 || 0.2 || 6.1 || 5.3 || 11.4 || 2.4 || 3.1
|- 
| 2018 ||  || 13
| 14 || 3 || 6 || 127 || 77 || 204 || 51 || 37 || 0.2 || 0.4 || 9.1 || 5.5 || 14.6 || 3.6 || 2.6
|-
| 2019 ||  || 13
| 1 || 0 || 0 || 11 || 6 || 17 || 5 || 2 || 0.0 || 0.0 || 11.0 || 6.0 || 17.0 || 5.0 || 2.0
|- 
| 2020 ||  || 4
| 18 || 3 || 4 || 138 || 69 || 207 || 63 || 52 || 0.2 || 0.2 || 7.7 || 3.8 || 11.5 || 3.5 || 2.9
|-
| 2021 ||  || 4
| 21 || 7 || 0 || 103 || 96 || 199 || 35 || 58 || 0.3 || 0.0 || 4.9 || 4.6 || 9.5 || 1.7 || 2.8
|- 
| 2022 ||  || 4
| 21 || 8 || 6 || 132 || 112 || 244 || 74 || 36 || 0.4 || 0.3 || 6.3 || 5.3 || 11.6 || 3.5 || 1.7
|- class=sortbottom
! colspan=3 | Career
! 105 !! 42 !! 28 !! 681 !! 558 !! 1239 !! 308 !! 277 !! 0.4 !! 0.3 !! 6.5 !! 5.3 !! 11.8 !! 2.9 !! 2.6
|}

Notes

References

External links

1997 births
Living people
Australian rules footballers from Western Australia
Indigenous Australian players of Australian rules football
Australian people of Chinese descent
Australian people of Dutch descent
South Fremantle Football Club players
Gold Coast Football Club players
Brisbane Lions players